Jady Menezes (born 13 February 1992) is a Brazilian kickboxer that competes in the Glory Bantamweight division.

Mixed martial arts career
Jady Menezes has a 3–1 record in MMA, with 2 wins coming by way of TKO. She has spent the entirety of her MMA career competing for regional promotions in the Paraná state of Brazil from 2014 to 2015.

Kickboxing career
In 2018, at Glory 56: Denver, Menzes faced Anissa Meksen in a bid to win to the Glory Super Bantamweight Kickboxing Championship. Menezes won a highly controversial split decision, which would be dubbed "Robbery of the Year" by Combat Press. 

Menezes later lost the title in a rematch against Meksen three months later by way of TKO at Glory 61: New York.

Championships and accomplishments
Glory 
Glory Women's Super Bantamweight Champion (55.38 kg/122 lb)

Combat Press 
2018 Robbery of the Year

Kickboxing record

|-  style="background:#cfc;"
| 2019-11-23 || Win ||align=left| Chommanee Sor Taehiran || Glory 72: Miami || Miami, Florida || KO (body punch) || 3 || 1:57 
|-
|- style="background:#fbb;"
| 2019-09-28 || Loss ||align=left| Tiffany van Soest || Glory 68: Miami || Miami, Florida || Decision (unanimous) || 3 || 3:00 
|-
|- style="background:#fbb;"
| 2018-11-02 || Loss ||align=left| Anissa Meksen || Glory 61: New York || New York City, New York || TKO (punches) || 2 || 0:39
|-
! style=background:white colspan=9 |
|-
|- style="background:#cfc;"
| 2018-08-10 || Win ||align=left| Anissa Meksen || Glory 56: Denver || Denver, Colorado || Decision (split) || 5 || 3:00    
|-
! style=background:white colspan=9 |
|- style="background:#fbb;"
| 2017-07-14 || Loss ||align=left| Anissa Meksen || Glory 43: New York || New York City, New York || Decision (unanimous) || 3 || 3:00 
|-
|- style="background:#cfc;"
| 2015-12-13|| Win ||align=left| Caroline Correia || Imortal FC 2: Kamikaze || São José dos Pinhais, Brazil || TKO || 2 ||  
|-
| colspan=9 |Legend:

Mixed martial arts record

|-
| Win
| align=center| 3–1
| Marta Souza
| Decision (split)
| Gladiator CF 13
| 
| align=center| 3
| align=center| 5:00
| Curitiba, Paraná, Brazil
|
|-
| Win
| align=center| 2–1
| Jessica Suelem
| TKO (punches)
| Curitiba Top Fight 9
| 
| align=center| 2
| align=center| 2:38
| Curitiba, Paraná, Brazil
|
|-
| Win
| align=center| 1–1
| Gisele Cardoso
| TKO
| Paraná Vale Tudo
| 
| align=center| 1
| align=center| 2:19
| Maringá, Paraná, Brazil
|
|-
| Loss
| align=center| 0–1
| Hevellyn Moura
| Decision (unanimous)
| Maringá Combat 2
| 
| align=center| 3
| align=center| 5:00
| Maringá, Paraná, Brazil
|
|-

References

External links
 Jady Menezes at Awakening Fighters

1992 births
Sportspeople from Curitiba
Brazilian female kickboxers
Brazilian Muay Thai practitioners
Female Muay Thai practitioners
Brazilian female mixed martial artists
Strawweight mixed martial artists
Mixed martial artists utilizing Muay Thai
Bantamweight kickboxers
Glory kickboxers
Living people
21st-century Brazilian women